Strife is an American hardcore punk band from Thousand Oaks, California. They formed in 1991.

Biography
Their first LP, One Truth, was released in 1994 via Victory Records.

Their second album, In This Defiance, was released in 1997 and includes guest appearances, with Chino Moreno of Deftones, Dino Cazares of Fear Factory and Igor Cavalera of Sepultura all taking turns on the album.

They broke up two years later citing creative differences and exhaustion. Victory Records released Truth Through Defiance, a compilation of live tracks and previously unreleased material.

They reunited in 2000, playing several benefit concerts. By the following year, they had re-formed and released Angermeans. No longer straight edge, this album was considered by the band to be a more mature and focused continuation of In This Defiance.

Since 2001, they have played several shows and tours all over the globe again, including a Japan tour with Floorpunch in 2011, a tour of South America, a European tour, and some dates in Mexico.

They traveled to Brazil to record Witness a Rebirth. Guitarist Andrew Kline commented the album would be "more along the lines of In This Defiance". It was also revealed that Igor Cavalera, formerly of Sepultura and Cavalera Conspiracy, would be handling all drum duties for the album.

Members
Current
Andrew Kline – guitar
Chad J. Peterson – bass guitar
Rick Rodney – vocals
Craig Anderson – drums
Todd Turnham – guitar

Former
Sid Niesen
Mike Hartsfield
Mike Machin – guitar
Etienne Fauquet of French band  – guitar on Angermeans, US Tour
Aaron Rossi – drums
Pepe Magana – drums

Discography

My Fire Burns On... (1992, NWK)
Strife (1992)
One Truth CD (1994, Caroline Records)
reissued in 1994 on CD/LP/CS by Victory Records 014
reissued in 2006 on CD by Victory Records
Grey 7" single (1995, Victory Records)
In This Defiance CD/LP/CS (1997, Victory Records 054)
reissued in 2006 on CD by Victory Records
Truth Through Defiance CD/LP/CS (1999, Victory Records 092)
compilation of rare, demo, live, and alternate recordings
reissued in 2006 on CD by Victory Records
Angermeans CD (2001, Victory Records 130)
reissued in 2006 on CD by Victory Records
Witness a Rebirth CD/LP/Digital (2012, 6131 Records 048)
released in UK / Europe on CD/LP by Holy Roar Records
released in Australia on CD/LP by Dogfight Records
released in South America on CD by Caustic Recordings
Incision [EP] (2015)

Compilation appearances
Only the Strong MCMXCIII CD/LP (1993, Victory Records VR10)
includes the song "What Will Remain?"
Anti-Matter CD/LP/CS (1996, Another Planet Records 6006)
includes the song "Circuit"
California Takeover Live CD/LP/CS (1996, Victory Records 042)
includes the songs "To an End", "Lift", and "Clam the Fire"
Cinema Beer Nuts CD (1997, Hopeless Records 623)
includes the song "Blistered"
God Money CD/CS (1997, V2 Records 27002)
includes the song "Untitled"
It's for Life CD (1997, Victory Records)
includes the song "Am I the Only One?"
Localism: A Compilation of Bands From the Oxnard Area (1996, It's Alive Records)
includes the song "Dedication"
Victory Style II CD (1997, Victory Records 055)
includes the song "Force of Change"
Area 51 CD (1998, Victory Records 067)
includes the song "Forgotten One"
STV Sessions 1.0 CD (1998, 4:20 Records 4201)
includes the song "Circuit"
Victory Singles, Vol. 2 CD (1998, Victory Records 079)
includes the songs "To an End" and "Grey"
reissued in 2006 on CD by Victory Records
Victory Style III CD (1998, Victory Records 087)
includes the song "Waiting"
Victory Style 4 CD (2000, Victory Records 115)
includes the song "Untitled"
Decapitated CD (Oglio Records/Glue Factory Records 70004)
includes the song "Circuit"
Expose Yourself CD (Go-Kart Records 300038)
includes the song "Blistered"

Videography
One Truth Live VHS (1996, Victory Records 043)
reissued in 2001 in DVD by Victory Records

Music videos
 "Blistered" (1997)
 "Through and Through" (1999)
 "Untitled" (1999)
 "Torn Apart" (2012)
 "Carry the Torch" (2013)

Related bands
Against the Wall - Mike Hartsfield
Amendment Eighteen - Mike Hartsfield
Cross My Heart Hope To Die - Andrew Kline
Drift Again - Mike Hartsfield
Endwell - Mike Hartsfield
Eyelid - Mike Machin
Free Will - Mike Hartsfield
Outspoken - Mike Hartsfield
Solitude - Mike Hartsfield
The Suppression Swing - Mike Hartsfield
Turnedown - Andrew Kline
DJ Sid Vicious - Sid Niesen

References

External links
An interview with Rick Rodney from 2001

Musical groups from Los Angeles
Musical groups established in 1991
Hardcore punk groups from California
Victory Records artists
1991 establishments in California
Metalcore musical groups from California